Eastbourne Lifeboat Station is a Royal National Lifeboat Institution (RNLI) lifeboat station in the town of Eastbourne in East Sussex. Founded two years before the RNLI was established, the station has operated continuously since 1822 and its lifeboats have been responsible for saving over 700 lives. There are two active lifeboat stations in Eastbourne, an all-weather station with the Tamar-class lifeboat Diamond Jubilee (ON 1303) at Sovereign Harbour and the D-class Lawrence and Percy Hobbs (D 744) at the inshore lifeboat station a couple of miles to the west at Fisherman's Green. An older lifeboat station, west of Eastbourne Pier, is now used as an RNLI museum.

History

Establishment and early years
Samaritan or The Rose, the first Eastbourne lifeboat, built by John and William Simpson, was donated to the town in 1822 by the local Member of Parliament, John 'Mad Jack' Fuller, a noted philanthropist. He had witnessed how local fishermen had attempted to rescue the crew of the ship Thames, which had run aground in a storm off Eastbourne, and concluded that a purpose-built lifeboat was needed to improve the chance of successful rescues.

In her 41 years of service from 1822 to 1863, she saw seven service launches and saved 55 lives. Her first sea trial took place in 1822, two years before the Royal National Lifeboat Institution (RNLI) was founded, but it was not until February 1833 that her first service launch took place, saving 29 people.

The lifeboatmen were local fishermen with great experience of the waters off Eastbourne and the physical fitness needed to row and sail a boat through heavy seas. The work was extremely dangerous, especially as most could not swim; it was not until 1854 that the RNLI introduced the first cork lifejackets. It became traditional for members of the same family to volunteer and for families to have a long association with the lifeboat. At one point in 1900, eight of the 17 men in the crew were from the same family. The family of the first coxswain of the Eastbourne Lifeboat, Edward Allchorn, remained involved for generations and one of Edward's descendants, Thomas Allchorn, was to serve as coxswain over 130 years later. The involvement of local fishermen has diminished greatly over the years as the fishing industry has shrunk, and only about 9% of RNLI crews now have a maritime background.

Later 19th century
The Samaritan was replaced in 1863 by Mary Stirling, gifted by J. Stirling Donald of Cheltenham. She served from 1863 to 1880 and saw five service launches in which no lives were saved. A new boathouse was built on the Stade, alongside its predecessor, to house the Mary Stirling.

In 1867, a new brick boathouse was built inshore to replace the previous wooden boathouses. It still stands today on what is now Marine Road, while the site of the former boathouses is now occupied by the Parade. It remained in use until 1902 and was subsequently used for many years as an electricity substation.

A replacement lifeboat, William and Mary, was gifted in 1880 by the friends of the RNLI in Manchester. Serving from 1880 to 1899, her 12 service launches resulted in the saving of 45 lives. One of her launches, on 25 November 1883, was one of the most notable achievements in the history of the Eastbourne Lifeboat. When news reached Eastbourne of a ship in trouble near Belle Tout Lighthouse, west of the town, the appalling weather conditions made it impossible to launch the lifeboat from Eastbourne beach. A team of seven horses was used to pull the boat on its carriage five miles overland to Birling Gap, with another three horses used to provide a boost on the steep hills in between. The Gap was too narrow to allow the lifeboat to pass through so it was offloaded onto skids while helpers cut away the banks to allow the boat to reach the beach. Launched into the teeth of a gale, the lifeboat was able to reach the stricken ship, the New Brunswick, after 45 minutes of rowing. The lifeboatmen were able to throw a line to the ship and evacuate the New Brunswick's eleven crewmembers. All managed to reach the shore successfully. In recognition of this feat, the lifeboatmen were awarded a special medal for the rescue of the New Brunswick.

A new boathouse was built in 1898 following the murder of the actor William Terriss in London the previous December. The Daily Telegraph launched a memorial appeal which enabled the William Terriss Memorial Boathouse to be constructed.

20th century

William and Mary's successor , introduced in 1899, was one of 20 lifeboats financed by the will of James Stevens of Birmingham.

Soon after the opening of the William Terriss Memorial Boathouse, it became apparent that the beach profile at that location caused problems when launching the lifeboat during storms. An additional lifeboat station was built at Fishermans Green further east along the beach. The boat was donated through the legacy of the Misses Wingate of Edinburgh and had five service launches between 1903 and 1921 in which no lives were saved. The oldest of the three boathouses, at Marine Road, was closed and the James Stevens No. 6 remained in the William Terriss Memorial Boathouse, which was now designated as No. 2 Eastbourne lifeboat station.

Eastbourne's first motor lifeboat, the Priscilla MacBean arrived in 1921 as a bequest from E. MacBean of Helensburgh. Serving until 1927, she saw 11 service launches in which six lives were saved.

The William Terriss Memorial Boathouse was closed as an operational boathouse in 1924 and was used to display the newly retired James Stevens No. 6 as a "display lifeboat". The lifeboat was sold in 1936, though the oars are still on display in the boathouse, which became the RNLI's first museum.

Another self-righting boat, LP and St. Helen, was bequeathed by the legacies of A. Lovelock, A. Pett and H. Turner.

Jane Holland, a motor lifeboat bequeathed through the legacy of W. Clarke of London, served from 1929 to 1949 and saw more launches – a total of 55 – than any of her predecessors, saving 65 lives. In 1940, lifeboatmen Thomas Allchorn and Alec Huggett were awarded RNLI bronze medals for their roles in the rescue of the crew of the steamer Barnhill. The ship was struck by German bombs and set on fire while about six miles off Beachy Head. Although 28 of the crew had been taken off by the lifeboat, Allchorn and Huggett went back on board the burning vessel to rescue her master.

Post-war years
The Beryl Tollemache was Eastbourne's first lifeboat to be equipped with a protective cabin and a radio. Gifted in 1949 by Sir Lyonel and Lady Tollemache of Richmond, the 41-foot (12.5 m) beach-launched Watson-class boat was launched 176 times and saved 154 lives. One of her most notable rescues involved the SS Germania, a 3,000-ton vessel which collided with another ship and ran aground on 26 April 1955. The lifeboat rescued 26 crewmembers just as the ship broke in two and took them ashore. On 6 May, the salvage boats Moonbeam and Endeavour got into trouble in severe weather around the wrecked Germania. The Beryl Tollemache towed Endeavour to safety, turned around and returned to the stricken Moonbeam. However, the towline broke four times in the rough seas and the lifeboat's propeller was damaged by driftwood. The lifeboatmen nonetheless managed to get the Moonbeam back to Eastbourne Pier. Soon afterwards, they received reports that salvage men left aboard the wreck of the Germania were sending up distress flares. The Beryl Tollemache set off yet again at 9.30 pm, by which time the waves were so large that they were breaking right over the Germania's mast tops. Despite the great danger, Thomas Allchorn's skilful handling of the lifeboat enabled all 16 men aboard the wreck to be taken off safely. He was later awarded the RNLI Bronze Second-Service Clasp and the Maud Smith Award for that year's bravest act of lifesaving.

Another notable rescue performed by the Beryl Tollemache was that of the crew of the Norwegian tanker Sitakund which exploded in the English Channel on 20 October 1968. The lifeboat and other vessels successfully evacuated 31 survivors from the tanker before returning the next day with a complement of firefighters to tackle the burning vessel. The Beryl Tollemache remained in front-line service until May 1977, when she was reassigned to the RNLI's relief fleet. The lifeboat is still in use today for tours to Coquet Island off Amble in Northumberland.

An early version of the RNLI D-class inflatable inshore lifeboat was introduced in 1964. The fast and manoeuvrable inflatables allowed rescues to be carried out closer to the shore and in shallow waters. The boats served from 1964 to 2003 with financing from various donors. They were launched 739 times and saved 265 lives. Their successors were the Joan and Ted Wiseman 50, which served from August 2003 to September 2011, and the Laurence and Percy Hobbs, which has served from September 2011 to date. The inshore lifeboats are housed in the Fishermans Green lifeboat station. 

One notable rescue carried out by the inshore lifeboat was that of a man found clinging to a ledge on Eastbourne Pier at midnight on 7 April 1997. The lifeboat was called out but was thrown against the pier by the waves, suffering severe damage, and began to deflate. Three people on the pier trying to help the man also got into difficulties. Lifeboatman Ian Stringer managed to hold the boat in place long enough for all four people to be rescued and taken safely back to the shore. He was awarded an RNLI Silver Medal for Gallantry for his work.

Larger lifeboats continued to be used as well, and in 1977 another Beach Watson-class lifeboat, the Charles Dibdin, was introduced into service at Eastbourne. She was funded by the Civil Service Lifeboat Fund and was the 32nd such lifeboat funded. She served from 1977 to 1979, was launched 11 times and saved 13 lives.

The Eastbourne Lifeboat Appeal funded the introduction in 1979 of the Duke of Kent, a  Rother-class self-righting lifeboat named after (and by) the eponymous duke and president of the RNLI. The boat was equipped with up-to-date technology including radar and an echo sounder. In her 14 years of service between 1979 and 1993, she was launched 353 times, saving 86 lives. She was kept busy by a rapid growth in the popularity of leisure sailing and watersports, but some more unusual challenges also presented themselves. Filming for the James Bond film The Living Daylights took place off Beachy Head at the end of 1986 but nearly ended in tragedy when a motorboat carrying three film crew capsized. It was only when their boat began to be smashed against rocks that they decided to leave. The lifeboat's coxswain, Ian Stringer, was awarded the RNLI's Bronze Medal for his role in the rescue. 

The Duke of Kent was replaced in 1993 by the Royal Thames, funded by an appeal by the Royal Thames Yacht Club and an anonymous donation. The  Mersey-class self-righting lifeboat served until 2012. She was supported by the relief lifeboat Fisherman's Friend, which made a notable rescue of the stricken yacht Paperchase on 20 October 2002. The Paperchase got into trouble in a Force 8 gale which left her crew, a married couple, clinging to the mast. Lifeboat Mechanic Dan Guy enabled the woman to be pulled into the lifeboat but was himself swept into the sea as he tried to rescue her unconscious husband. The two spent 20 minutes in the water before being rescued; both survived. Mark Sawyer, the coxswain, was awarded the RNLI's Silver Medal while Guy received the Bronze Medal and the crew were given Medal Service Certificates. 

Eastbourne's current All Weather Lifeboat is the Diamond Jubilee, a  self-righting Tamar-class lifeboat. Since 1993, the All Weather Lifeboat has been moored afloat in a new lifeboat station in the Sovereign Harbour development.

Fleet

All weather lifeboats

Inshore lifeboats

Neighbouring Station Locations

References

External links

 Eastbourne RNLI

History of East Sussex
Lifeboat stations in East Sussex
Eastbourne
1822 establishments in England